Atlanta was a steamboat built in 1908 at Houghton, Washington which served on Lake Washington and Puget Sound until 1938, when it was converted into a diesel-powered houseboat.

Construction
Atlanta, launched May 28, 1908, was the first vessel built at the Houghton shipyard after it had been taken over by Captain John L. Anderson from its former owners, Captains George Bartsch and Harry Tompkins, and renaming it the Anderson Shipyard before it was later renamed to Lake Washington Shipyard.  This process had begun in 1906 at the suggest of Jacob Furth, a banker who had also financed the La Conner Trading and Transportation Company.

Atlanta was built entirely of wood.

Atlanta was registered as steamship number 205232 and was reported to require only two crewmen, at least as of 1909.  The vessel cost $30,000 to construct.

Career
Following completion, Atlanta was operated in passenger service on Lake Washington and on the Lake Washington Ship Canal after it was completed in 1916.  Anderson, and his firm, the Anderson Steamboat Company faced competition from government-owned and built ferries.  Even so, he used his own vessels, the Fortuna and the Atlanta to transport people to Rainier Beach on Lake Washington to witness the launching, on December 5, 1913, of the new King County ferry Leschi.

In 1917 Atlanta was still owned by Anderson Steamship Company.

In the summer of 1922, Atlanta was successfully used as a tourist vessel by Capt. John L. Anderson, making a popular two-hour cruise of Elliott Bay, the Ballard Locks, Lake Union, the Lake Washington Ship Canal, and Lake Washington.  By this time, Anderson had sold his interests in his first business, the Anderson Steamboat Company, and was operating Atlanta under the business name of Anderson Water Tours.

Later years
Anderson later sold Atlanta to King County, but leased it back from the county as part of his agreement to operate the county's ferry fleet.  In November 1938, Anderson turned Atlanta back to the county, which, having no use for the vessel, sold it at a sheriff's auction for $510 to Russel T. Gibson.  He then sold the vessel to Delta V. Smyth, an Olympia lumber mill owner who owned a number tug boats.  Smyth removed Atlantas compound steam engine, and installed it in his tug Olympian.  Walter House, who worked for Smyth's company, then installed a  diesel engine in the Atlanta hull, and converted the vessel into a houseboat.

In 1943, the diesel engine that had been placed in Atlanta was removed and installed in the tug Margaret S, which belonged to the American Tug Company, an Everett, Washington concern.  Atlanta then became a shoreside house on Lake Union, where it was still in existence as of 1966.

Notes

References 
 Kline, M.S., and Bayless, G.A., Ferryboats -- A legend on Puget Sound, Bayless Books, Seattle, WA 1983 
 Newell, Gordon R., ed., H.W. McCurdy Marine History of the Pacific Northwest,  Superior Publishing Co., Seattle, WA (1966)
 Newell, Gordon R., Ships of the Inland Sea, Superior Publishing Co., Seattle, WA (2nd Ed. 1960)
  U.S. Dept. of the Treasury, Bureau of Statistics, Annual List of Merchant Vessels of the United States (for year ending June 30, 1909)
 Public Service Comm'n vs. Anderson Steamboat Co., Case No. 4348, published in Eighth Annual Report of the Public Service Comm'n of Washington (1918), at page 179. (accessed 06-06-11)

External links
 Atlanta on Lake Washington or Puget Sound, unknown photographer University of Washington digital image TRA0315 (accessed 06-13-11).
 Atlanta and other steamboats of Anderson Steamboat Co., at dock on east side of Lake Washington University of Washington digital image TRA0316 (accessed 06-13-11).
 Atlanta, apparently about to be launched, May 1908 University of Washington digital image L 75.0121 (accessed 06-13-11).
 Atlanta in Hiram M. Chittenden Locks undated photograph by Lawrence Denny Lindsley (1878-1975), University of Washington digital image LIN0378 (accessed 06-13-11).

1908 ships
Steamboats of Washington (state)
Propeller-driven steamboats of Washington (state)
Ships built at Lake Washington Shipyard